This is a list of secondary schools in Northern Ireland, according to the Department of Education (Northern Ireland).



References

 
Secondary schools